Palomar Hills is a neighborhood in southwestern Lexington, Kentucky, United States. Its boundaries are Harrodsburg Road to the east, Man o' War Boulevard to the north, Bowman Mill Road to the south, and the Lexington urban growth boundary to the west.

Neighborhood statistics

 Population: 710 
 Land Area: 
 Population density: 2,184 people per square mile
 Median household income (2010): $91,953

References

Neighborhoods in Lexington, Kentucky